Introduction to Theoretical Linguistics is a 1968 book by Sir John Lyons.

Reception
The book was reviewed by William Haas, Stanley Starosta and Kazimierz Polański.

References

External links
Introduction to Theoretical Linguistics
1968 non-fiction books
Linguistics textbooks
Cambridge University Press books